
Wild rose is the common name of certain flowering shrubs:
Any wild members of the Genus Rosa (see List of Rosa species), or, more especially:
 Rosa acicularis, "wild rose", a rose species which occurs in Asia, Europe, and North America
 Rosa arkansana, "wild prairie rose", a rose species native to a large area of central North America
 Rosa canina, "wild rose" or "dog rose", a climbing rose species native to Europe, northwest Africa and western Asia
 Rosa virginiana, "Virginia rose", a rose species native to North America
Rosa woodsii, "wild rose" of the sagebrush steppe in the Great Basin of North America
Genus Diplolaena:
Diplolaena grandiflora, an Australian flowering shrub

Wild Rose or Wildrose may also refer to:

Places
Canada
 Wild Rose, Edmonton, neighbourhood in Edmonton, Alberta
 Wild Rose (electoral district)
 Wild Rose, Saskatchewan
Wildrose, North Dakota
 Wild Rose, Wisconsin, village
 Wild Rose, Richland County, Wisconsin, unincorporated community

Arts, literature, music
 Wild Rose (band), a country music performance group
 Wild Rose, a novel by American writer Deb Caletti
 Wild Roses, a painting by Vincent van Gogh
 Wild Rose, a musical by W. O. Mitchell
 "Wild Rose", a song by the Bombay Rockers
 "Wild Roses", a song by Of Monsters and Men from Fever Dream, 2019

Film and television
 Wildrose (film), a 1984 film directed by John Hanson
 Wild Rose (film), a 2018 film directed by Tom Harper
 Wild Roses (film), a 2017 Polish film directed by Anna Jadowska
 Wild Roses (TV series), a Canadian television show

Bars, brewers, beverages
 The Wildrose (bar), Seattle lesbian bar opened in 1984
 Wild Rose Brewery, a beer brewery located in Calgary, Alberta
 Wild Irish Rose, an alcoholic beverage produced by Canandaigua Wine Company

Politics
Wildrose Party, a political party in Alberta which merged into the United Conservative Party
Wildrose Party of Alberta, forerunner of the Wildrose Party
Wildrose Independence Party of Alberta, a provincial political party consisting of the merging of the Freedom Conservative Party of Alberta and Wexit Alberta

Ships
 USS Wilrose II (SP-195), a United States Navy patrol vessel in service from 1918 to 1919 sometimes referred to in U.S. Navy records as "USS Wild Rose"